Ernesto Prinoth (15 April 1923 in Urtijëi, Italy – 26 November 1981 in Innsbruck, Austria) was a racing driver from Italy, and founder of Prinoth AG, manufacturer of snow grooming vehicles and equipment.

Prinoth started in Formula One in 1961 with his Lotus 18, racing in various non-Championship events, securing podium finishes in two relatively minor races. He entered the 1962 Italian Grand Prix with backing from Scuderia Jolly Club but failed to qualify, and this was his only attempt at a World Championship Formula One event. He returned in 1963 for two more Formula One races, all his appearances being at the wheel of the same car.

His son Erich was also a racing driver, and competed in the Ferrari Challenge.

Racing record

Complete Formula One World Championship results
(key)

Non-Championship Formula One results

(key)

References

 "The Grand Prix Who's Who", Steve Small, 1995.
 "The Formula One Record Book", John Thompson, 1974.

External links
 Notes on Prinoth history - On the site of Prinoth AG

1923 births
1981 deaths
People from Urtijëi
Italian people of Austrian descent
Italian racing drivers
Italian Formula One drivers
Sportspeople from Südtirol